Salur, Kumluca is a village in the District of Kumluca, Antalya Province, Turkey. As of 2010 it had a population of 2,239 people.

References

Villages in Kumluca District